Luis M. Martinez (born April 3, 1985) is a Colombian-American former professional baseball catcher. He has played in Major League Baseball (MLB) for the San Diego Padres and Texas Rangers.

Career

New York Mets
Prior to playing professionally, he attended Coral Park High School, Jackson State Community College, and then Cumberland University. He was originally drafted by the New York Mets in the 11th round of the 2005 amateur draft, however he opted not to sign.

San Diego Padres
He was next drafted by the Padres in the 12th round of the 2007 amateur draft, beginning his professional career that year.

Martinez played for the Eugene Emeralds and Fort Wayne Wizards in 2007, hitting a combined .253 with two home runs and 17 RBI in 45 games. In 2008, he hit .223 with three home runs and 19 RBI with the Wizards. With the Lake Elsinore Storm and Portland Beavers in 2009, Martinez hit .286 with four home runs and 41 RBI in 94 games. He hit .282 with two home runs and 31 RBI with the San Antonio Missions in 2010.

Texas Rangers
On December 21, 2011, Martinez was traded to the Texas Rangers for pitcher Ryan Kelly.

Luis Martinez was recalled from AAA Round Rock on August 11 when Mike Napoli was placed on the disabled list

He was designated for assignment on December 26, 2012 and removed from the Rangers' 40-man roster.

Los Angeles Angels of Anaheim
On November 19, 2013 Martinez signed a minor league contract with the Los Angeles Angels of Anaheim.

Boston Red Sox
On January 23, 2015, he signed a minor league deal with the Boston Red Sox. He became a free agent on November 7, 2015.

References

External links

1985 births
Living people
Baseball players from Miami
Bowie Baysox players
Cumberland Phoenix baseball players
Estrellas Orientales players
American expatriate baseball players in the Dominican Republic
Eugene Emeralds players
Fort Wayne Wizards players
Lake Elsinore Storm players
Major League Baseball catchers
Norfolk Tides players
Pawtucket Red Sox players
Peoria Saguaros players
Portland Beavers players
Portland Sea Dogs players
Round Rock Express players
Sacramento River Cats players
Salt Lake Bees players
San Antonio Missions players
San Diego Padres players
Texas Rangers players
Tucson Padres players
Jackson State Generals baseball players